Peter James O'Brien may refer to:
James O'Brien (New Zealand politician) (1874–1947), New Zealand politician with the full name of Peter James O'Brien
Pete O'Brien (1890s second baseman) (1867–1937), American Major League Baseball player with the full name of Peter James O'Brien

See also
Peter O'Brien (disambiguation)